Jeffersontown is a home rule-class city in Jefferson County, Kentucky, United States. The population was 26,595 at the 2010 U.S. census.

It is a major suburb of Louisville. When the Louisville Metro government was established in 2003, Jeffersontown chose to retain its status as an independent city. It is the metro area's largest municipality outside Louisville.  Locally, the city is often referred to by the abbreviated name J-town.

History

Before European exploration, this was occupied by succeeding cultures of Native Americans. They hunted the area for its rich game, including bison herds. The bison created paths through the forests and meadows for their seasonal migrations that were later used by Native Americans and, in turn, by Europeans and Americans alike.

Located in southeastern Jefferson County, along the north central border of Kentucky, Jeffersontown was initially developed in the late 1700s as a stopover and trading station for early European-American pioneers on their way to the Falls of the Ohio at Louisville. Farmers began to cultivate the rich land, which was surveyed by Thomas Bullitt in 1773 and John Floyd the next year. The Hites, Tylers, and Oldhams all settled the area under land grants given to veterans for military service following the American Revolutionary War, as the new government was cash poor.

In 1794, Abraham Bruner purchased  of land. In May 1797, he successfully petitioned the Jefferson County Fiscal Court to incorporate a  section of his land as the city of Jefferson  named either after the county or after Thomas Jefferson, then the vice president of the United States. The city was long known as Bruner's Town or Brunerstown by its inhabitants, but the usage Jefferson Town eventually became adopted as its present name.

A large, 600-acre area from the pioneer days has been preserved since the late 20th century and recognized as the Tyler Settlement Rural Historic District. It is used largely for agricultural purposes. This district is east of Jeffersontown; it contains several of the Tylers' original log cabins and barns. A large portion of the Tyler settlement is known as the Blackacre Nature Preserve. This 170-acre tract is used by Jefferson County public schools as part of their environmental education.

Geography
Jeffersontown is located at  (38.206102, -85.573619).

Demographics
As of the census of 2010, there were 26,595 people, 10,653 households, and 7,275 families residing in the city. The racial makeup of the city was 82.2% White, 11.1% African American, 0.2% Native American, 1.8% Asian, 0.1% Pacific Islander, 2.1% from other races, and 2.5% from two or more races. Hispanic or Latino of any race were 5.04% of the population.

There were 10,653 households, out of which 32.9% had children under the age of 18 living with them, 54.3% were married couples living together, 10.7% had a female householder with no husband present, and 31.7% were non-families. 26.4% of all households were made up of individuals, and 6.4% had someone living alone who was 65 years of age or older. The average household size was 2.46 and the average family size was 2.99.

In the city, the population was spread out, with 24.8% under the age of 18, 7.7% from 18 to 24, 33.4% from 25 to 44, 23.3% from 45 to 64, and 10.8% who were 65 years of age or older. The median age was 36 years. For every 100 females, there were 92.8 males. For every 100 females age 18 and over, there were 89.1 males.

The median income for a household in the city was $51,999, and the median income for a family was $60,951. Males had a median income of $41,345 versus $29,537 for females. The per capita income for the city was $23,977. About 3.7% of families and 4.3% of the population were below the poverty line, including 5.4% of those under age 18 and 5.4% of those age 65 or over.

Economy

The Bluegrass Commerce Park (formerly known as The Bluegrass Research & Industrial Park) opened in 1966 and encompasses . It was the first such development in the United States. The park is the largest in the state of Kentucky. The 38,000 employees who work there make the park and Jeffersontown the third-largest city of employment in the state.
The park's seven units include:
Bluegrass Commerce Park
Commonwealth Park
Watterson Trail Industrial Park
Plainview Office Park
Jeffersontown Industrial Park
Holloway Industrial Park
Blankenbaker Crossings

Papa John's Pizza has its headquarters in Jeffersontown.
In November 2020, the company announced its new global headquarters would be moved to the Three Ballpark Center at The Battery Atlanta.

Government
The city of Jeffersontown is governed by a mayor and eight city council members. The mayor serves a four-year term of office while the council members serve two-year terms. The city council members are elected at-large, made up of the top eight candidates receiving the most votes in the general election.

Education
Jeffersontown has a lending library, a branch of the Louisville Free Public Library.

Notable people

 Jon Ackerson, politician who served in both houses of the Kentucky State Legislature; former Jeffersontown city council member

See also

 2018 Jeffersontown shooting
 Beechland (Jeffersontown, Kentucky)
 Confederate Martyrs Monument in Jeffersontown

References

External links
City website
History of Jeffersontown
"Jeffersontown: Huge Family Farms, Buffalo, Linn Station Fort Marked Landscape; Diseases Delayed Growth" – Article by M. David Goodwin of The Courier-Journal

 
Populated places established in 1797
Cities in Jefferson County, Kentucky
Cities in Kentucky
Louisville metropolitan area
1797 establishments in Kentucky